Kwon Eun-soo (born February 4, 1989) is a South Korean actress and model. She is best known for her lead roles in If You Were Me 4 as So-young and Wild Flowers as Eun-soo.  She also did a supporting role and appeared in the famous and popular drama Who Are You: School 2015 as Eun-soo.

Biography and career
Kwon studied broadcasting at Induk University.  She started her acting career in 2006.

Filmography

Television

Film

References

External links
 
 
 

1989 births
Living people
21st-century South Korean actresses
South Korean female models
South Korean television actresses
South Korean film actresses